Rakhine United FC Is a professional football club based in Rakhine State. It plays in the Myanmar National League.

History 
Previously known as the Rakhine United Football Club, the club changed its name to Rakhapura United F.C." in December 2010. The team's home stadium is Waytharli Yinpyin, located in Sittwe Township (Rakhine State).

Last season, Rakhapura United F.C. stood in the 10th position and had its biggest win (7-2) in the General Aung San Cup against Manaw Myay.

Sponsorship

Club

Coaching staff
{|class="wikitable"
|-
!Position
!Staff
|-
|Manager|| U Soe Thein
|-
|rowspan="2"|Assistant Manager|| U Maung Maung Myint
|-
| U Win Tin
|-
|Goalkeeper Coach|| U Aye Thar
|-
|Fitness Coach|| U Nan Da Kyaw
|-

Other information

|-

2017 players squad

References

Myanmar - Rakhapura United FC
Myanmar National League - Rakhapura United FC

External links 

 

Rakhine United